Steve Wong Ka Keung (born 13 November 1964) is a Hong Kong musician, singer, songwriter and the bassist for the rock band Beyond. He is also younger brother of lead vocalist and rhythm guitarist Wong Ka Kui, who died in 1993.

Life and career

1964–1999: Early life and Beyond 
Wong was born on 13 November 1964 in British Hong Kong and his ancestry is Taishan, Guangdong. He played music with Kubert Leung in a band. In late 1983 he joined Beyond to replace the band's original bassist Lee Wing Chiu (李榮潮). From the album Modern Stage (現代舞台)'s release in 1988, Wong began singing on some tracks, notably "Cold Rain Night" (冷雨夜) with lyrics by him and music by his brother Wong Ka Kui.

In June 1993, his brother Wong Ka Kui died in an accident in Japan. In 1994 Beyond released the album 2nd-Floor Band Room (二樓後座) and from then lead guitarist Paul Wong and he received the role of Beyond lead vocalist and main songwriter.

In late 1999, Beyond announced their launch of solo career. In 2002 Wong formed the group Picasso Horses with several young musicians and then signed a contract with Universal Records to cultivate bands.

1999–present: Solo career 
Wong is also a songwriter for many artists, including Leo Ku, Eason Chan, Amanda Lee, Jordan Chan, Faye Wong, etc.

In July 2009, Wong and Paul Wong ran three continuous sessions of concert in Hong Kong Coliseum despite private discord between them.

Wong held "Wong Ka Keung It's Alright Live Concert" on 4 to 5 June 2013, in Kowloonbay International Trade & Exhibition Centre.

Wong was the manager for the rock duo Soler, but they stopped their collaboration due to discord.

In December 2015, Wong attended BPA's 3rd annual dinner, sang Beyond signature works "Love You" (喜歡你) and "Glorious Years" (光輝歲月) with a couple of civil servants and took a photo with former chief executive Leung Chun Ying, leading to controversy from some netizens.

After that, Wong became a spokesman for a Gionee advertisement where a 3D projected image of his brother Wong Ka Kui appeared and they hugged each other, resulting in the second controversy but from fans.

Personal life 
He is now married to Makiko Mizuguchi from Japan, and they have two sons.

Discography 
 BeRightBack (BRB) (2002)
 Picasso Horses (2004)
 Ta Ta (2007)
 Wong Ka Kui Memorial Album (2008)
 Incense (2015)

Filmography 
 Sworn Brothers (1987)
 The Fun, The Luck & The Tycoon (1989)
 Happy Ghost IV (1990)
 Beyond's Diary (1991)

References

External links 
 The Official Website of Wong Ka-Keung
 Hong Kong Vintage Pop Radio – Beyond
 Wong Ka Keung in pinkwork (sound & video)

Beyond (band) members
1964 births
Living people
20th-century bass guitarists
20th-century Hong Kong male singers
21st-century bass guitarists
21st-century Hong Kong male singers
Hong Kong rock bass guitarists
Hong Kong Buddhists
Hong Kong male singer-songwriters
Cantopop singer-songwriters
Hong Kong rock musicians
Male bass guitarists